Parameshvara is an epithet of the Hindu destroyer deity, Shiva. The term usually  indicates the position of Shiva as the Supreme being and Supreme Reality in the tradition of Shaivism. Parameshvara is the ultimate and highest reality that eternally pervades all matter for Shaivas, the devotees of Shiva. He is regarded by devotees to be totality itself, controlling the triple forces of creation, preservation, and destruction.

Etymology 
The word is a compound of the Sanskrit words परम meaning 'Supreme' and ईश्वर meaning 'Lord'. Thus Parameshvara literally means 'highest supreme ruler'. Similarly, the word  ( + ) means 'Supreme shiva'. These two words are simultaneously used in Saivite texts as synonyms for Parabrahman, the Indian equivalent of Supreme being. Sometimes, other traditions of Hinduism such as Vedanta and Vaishnavism also use the term  as a synonym of Parabrahman within their philosophical perspectives.

Shaiva Siddhanta 

As the supreme being, Parameshvara only has the distinct eight characters or predicates which are applied to distinguish him from the other two entities of Shaiva Siddhanta—Pashu and Pasam.

These two forms can be compared with the Saguna and Nirguna definitions of Para brahman in the Vedantic tradition. Since they are inseparable and undifferentiated, Shaiva Siddhanta sees them as single oneness, Parameshvara.

Kashmir Shaivism 

Kashmiri Shaivism describes how all of reality, with all of its diversity and fluctuation, is the play of the single principle, Paramashiva. The two aspects of this single reality are inseparably united: Shiva and Shakti. Paramashiva appears as the world through his creative power, Shakti. The ontological nature of Paramashiva is beyond human knowledge and articulation, yet it can be experienced directly through mystical intuition.

See also
 Mahadevi
 Mahavishnu
 Parashiva
 Purushottama
 Sadashiva

References

Names of God in Hinduism
Hindu philosophical concepts